Pandemonium! is the third and final studio album from the boy band B2K. The album was released through Epic on December 10, 2002. It reached number one on the Top R&B/Hip-Hop Albums chart and number 10 on the Billboard 200 chart, and spawned their number one single "Bump, Bump, Bump". The singles "Girlfriend" and "What a Girl Wants" were included on the special edition of the album, which was released on March 25, 2003.

Composition
Pandemonium is primarily an R&B and hip hop album with influences of pop.

Critical reception

AllMusic editor William Ruhlmann noted how the album's production goes over the usual topics of male hip-hop songs, ranging from "lust ("Bump, Bump, Bump"); undying love ("One Kiss"); apology ("Sleepin'"); and, sung with the greatest feeling, accusations that the woman addressed is only interested in money ("Would You Be Here")." Ruhlmann added that there was some label meddling with the addition of "Why I Love You" from the group's self-titled debut and "Dog", a track from one of their artist's upcoming project. Beth Johnson of Entertainment Weekly said of the record, "Just nine months after their R&B-lite debut made the bubblegum set scream, the teenage quartet already have a second disc. This time, between sweet-harmonied ballads, they cue up randy singles ("Bump, Bump, Bump" with P. Diddy), bouncy odes to cruising chicks ("Back It Up"), and "gangsta" boasting. Shouldn't someone be setting a curfew?" Rolling Stones Christian Hoard described the album as "livelier-than-average R&B". He highlighted the track "Tease" for its merger of funk-influenced hip hop with smooth seductive delivery.

Commercial performance
Pandemonium! debuted at number ten on the Billboard 200 and at number three on Top R&B/Hip-Hop Albums selling 194,000 the first week. The album's lead single was "Bump, Bump, Bump", which reached number one on the Billboard Hot 100, becoming the group's first top ten and number one single. The second single was "Girlfriend", which peaked at number 30. A third single from the album was released, "Bump That", but the song did not manage to make both the Hot 100 or Hot R&B/Hip-Hop Songs charts. The fourth and final single was "What a Girl Wants". It contains a sample of the 1999 version of "What a Girl Wants" from Christina Aguilera. The song peaked at number 47 on the Hot R&B/Hip-Hop Songs.

Track listing

Notes
 signifies additional producer

Personnel

Credits adapted from the liner notes of Pandemonium!

Mastering: Gene Grimaldi (Oasis Mastering, Studio City, CA)
Art Direction and Design: Rance Brown, Natasha Jen
Photography: Keith Major

Charts

Weekly charts

Year-end charts

Certifications

References

2002 albums
B2K albums
Epic Records albums
Albums produced by Jermaine Dupri
Albums produced by R. Kelly
Albums produced by Troy Taylor (record producer)